Mir Shamsi was a mystic and a saint who lived in the Indian village of Karhan, Uttar Pradesh.

He was born Syed Shamsuddin, and was the mooris-e-aala of Saadat Karhan district Mau. (The mooris-e-aala is the patriarch of the family.) He died in the year 1651 AD. Not many records exist of his life, but this information can be read off his tombstone at his mazaar that is frequented by the locals and other who come to pay homage and ask for wishes to be granted.

In his lifetime, he had a reputation for helping people. He was born into a wealthy family, and helped the people of Karhan by getting a lake dug. This provided the villagers with much needed employment and water.

Recently a local politician whose wish of winning an election was fulfilled, built a structure to cover his originally unpretentious grave. 

Mir Shamsi is also an ancestor of the poet, author, intellectual, bureaucrat and Indian independence activist Ali Jawad Zaidi and Shamim Karhani (Syed Shahsuddin Haider) who was an Urdu poet of the 20th century.

17th-century Islamic religious leaders
Sufi saints